The 1988 National Soccer League Grand Final was the fourth National Soccer League Grand Final, the championship-deciding match of the Australian National Soccer League and the culmination of the 1988 season. The match was played between Sydney Croatia and Marconi Fairfield on 3 September 1988 at Parramatta Stadium in Sydney.

This was the first NSL Grand Final for both teams. Marconi Fairfield won 5–4 on penalties after a 2–2 draw and to be the first club to win the national league championship from fourth place. It was also the first Australian national league Grand Final to feature two teams of the same city, with both teams representing Sydney.

Teams

Route to the final

Sydney Croatia

Marconi Fairfield

Match

Details

See also
 1988 National Soccer League

References

1988 in Australian soccer
NSL Grand Finals
Soccer in Sydney
Sydney United 58 FC matches
Marconi Stallions FC matches